SS Clement Hill was a cargo and passenger Lake Victoria ferry in East Africa.

Bow, McLachlan and Company of Paisley in Renfrewshire, Scotland built her for the Uganda Railway in 1905. She was a "knock down" vessel; that is, she was bolted together in the shipyard at Paisley, all the parts marked with numbers, disassembled into many hundreds of parts and transported in kit form by sea to Kenya for reassembly.

Clement Hill was in service on the lake from March 1907 until 1935. Kenya and Uganda Railways and Harbours then stripped her of machinery and fittings and in 1936 scuttled her at Bukakata to form a breakwater.

References

1905 ships
Ships built on the River Clyde
Lake Victoria
Ships sunk as breakwaters